Russell Amos Kirk (October 19, 1918 – April 29, 1994) was an American political theorist, moralist, historian, social critic, and literary critic, known for his influence on 20th-century American conservatism. His 1953 book The Conservative Mind gave shape to the postwar conservative movement in the U.S. It traced the development of conservative thought in the Anglo-American tradition, giving special importance to the ideas of Edmund Burke. Kirk was considered the chief proponent of traditionalist conservatism. 
He was also an accomplished author of Gothic and ghost story fiction. He is often considered one of the most significant conservative men of letters of the twentieth century.

Life 
Russell Kirk was born in Plymouth, Michigan. He was the son of Russell Andrew Kirk, a railroad engineer, and Marjorie Pierce Kirk. Kirk obtained his B.A. at Michigan State University and a M.A. at Duke University. During World War II, he served in the American armed forces and corresponded with a libertarian writer, Isabel Paterson, who helped to shape his early political thought. After reading Albert Jay Nock's book, Our Enemy, the State, he engaged in a similar correspondence with him. After the war, he attended the University of St Andrews in Scotland. In 1953, he became the only American to be awarded the degree of Doctor of Letters by that university.

Kirk "laid out a post-World War II program for conservatives by warning them, 'A handful of individuals, some of them quite unused to moral responsibilities on such a scale, made it their business to extirpate the populations of Nagasaki and Hiroshima; we must make it our business to curtail the possibility of such snap decisions.'"

Upon completing his studies, Kirk took up an academic position at his alma mater, Michigan State. He resigned in 1959, after having become disenchanted with the rapid growth in student number and emphasis on intercollegiate athletics and technical training at the expense of the traditional liberal arts. Thereafter he referred to Michigan State as "Cow College" or "Behemoth University." He later wrote that academic political scientists and sociologists were "as a breed—dull dogs". Late in life, he taught one semester a year at Hillsdale College, where he was distinguished visiting professor of humanities.

Kirk frequently published in two American conservative journals he helped found, National Review in 1955 and Modern Age in 1957. He was the founding editor of the latter, 1957–59. Later he was made a Distinguished Fellow of the Heritage Foundation, where he gave a number of lectures.

After leaving Michigan State, Kirk returned to his ancestral home in Mecosta, Michigan, where he wrote the many books, academic articles, lectures, and the syndicated newspaper column (which ran for 13 years) by which he exerted his influence on American politics and intellectual life. In 1963, Kirk converted to Catholicism and married Annette Courtemanche; they had four daughters. She and Kirk became known for their hospitality, welcoming many political, philosophical, and literary figures in their Mecosta house (known as "Piety Hill"), and giving shelter to political refugees, hoboes, and others. Their home became the site of a sort of seminar on conservative thought for university students. Piety Hill now houses the Russell Kirk Center for Cultural Renewal. After his conversion to Catholicism Kirk was a founding board member of Una Voce America.

Kirk declined to drive, calling cars "mechanical Jacobins", and would have nothing to do with television and what he called "electronic computers".

Kirk did not always maintain a stereotypically "conservative" voting record. "Faced with the non-choice between Franklin Delano Roosevelt and Thomas Dewey in 1944, Kirk said no to empire and voted for Norman Thomas, the Socialist Party candidate." In the 1976 presidential election, he voted for Eugene McCarthy. In 1992 he supported Pat Buchanan's primary challenge to incumbent George H. W. Bush, serving as state chair of the Buchanan campaign in Michigan.

Kirk was a contributor to Chronicles. In 1989, he was presented with the Presidential Citizens Medal by President Ronald Reagan.

Political philosophy

The Conservative Mind 

The Conservative Mind: From Burke to Eliot, the published version of Kirk's doctoral dissertation, contributed materially to the 20th century Burke revival. It also drew attention to:
 Conservative statesmen such as John Adams, Alexander Hamilton, Fisher Ames, George Canning, John C. Calhoun, John Randolph of Roanoke, Joseph de Maistre, Benjamin Disraeli, and Arthur Balfour;
 The conservative implications of writings by well-known authors such as Samuel Taylor Coleridge, Sir Walter Scott, Alexis de Tocqueville, James Fenimore Cooper, Nathaniel Hawthorne, James Russell Lowell, George Gissing, George Santayana, Robert Frost, and T. S. Eliot;
 British and American authors such as Fisher Ames, John Randolph of Roanoke, Orestes Brownson, John Henry Newman, Walter Bagehot, Henry James Sumner Maine, William Edward Hartpole Lecky, Edwin Lawrence Godkin, William Hurrell Mallock, Leslie Stephen, Albert Venn Dicey, Robert Nisbet, Paul Elmer More, and Irving Babbitt.
The Portable Conservative Reader (1982), which Kirk edited, contains sample writings by most of the above.

Biographer Bradley J. Birzer argues that for all his importance in inspiring the modern conservative movement, not many of his followers agreed with his unusual approach to the history of conservatism. As summarized by reviewer Drew Maciag:
As Birzer's study demonstrates, Kirk's understanding of conservatism was so unique, idiosyncratic, transcendental, elitist, and in certain respects premodern and European, that it bore little resemblance to political conservatism in the United States. Conservative Mind successfully launched an intellectual challenge to postwar liberalism, but the variety of conservatism Kirk preferred found few takers, even within the American Right.

Harry Jaffa (a student of Leo Strauss) wrote: "Kirk was a poor Burke scholar. Burke's attack on metaphysical reasoning related only to modern philosophy's attempt to eliminate skeptical doubt from its premises and hence from its conclusions."

Russello (2004) argues that Kirk adapted what 19th-century American Catholic thinker Orestes Brownson called "territorial democracy" to articulate a version of federalism that was based on premises that differ in part from those of the founders and other conservatives. Kirk further believed that territorial democracy could reconcile the tension between treating the states as mere provinces of the central government, and as autonomous political units independent of Washington. Finally, territorial democracy allowed Kirk to set out a theory of individual rights grounded in the particular historical circumstances of the United States, while rejecting a universal conception of such rights.

In addition to bringing public attention to Anglo-American conservative principles, Kirk described his perception of liberal ideals in the first chapter. Kirk identified these ideals as the perfectibility of man, hostility towards tradition, rapid change in economic and political systems, and the secularization of government.

Principles 
Kirk developed six "canons" of conservatism, which Russello (2004) described as follows:
 A belief in a transcendent order, which Kirk described variously as based in tradition, divine revelation, or natural law;
 An affection for the "variety and mystery" of human existence;
 A conviction that society requires orders and classes that emphasize "natural" distinctions;
 A belief that property and freedom are closely linked;
 A faith in custom, convention, and prescription, and
 A recognition that innovation must be tied to existing traditions and customs, which entails a respect for the political value of prudence.

Kirk said that Christianity and Western Civilization are "unimaginable apart from one another" and that "all culture arises out of religion. When religious faith decays, culture must decline, though often seeming to flourish for a space after the religion which has nourished it has sunk into disbelief."

Political views

Libertarianism 
Kirk grounded his Burkean conservatism in tradition, political philosophy, belles lettres, and the strong religious faith of his later years, rather than libertarianism and free market economic reasoning. The Conservative Mind hardly mentions economics at all.

In a polemic, Kirk, quoting T. S. Eliot's expression, called libertarians "chirping sectaries," adding that conservatives and libertarians share opposition to "collectivism," "the totalist state," and "bureaucracy," but otherwise have "nothing" in common. He called the libertarian movement "an ideological clique forever splitting into sects still smaller and odder, but rarely conjugating." He said a line of division exists between believers in "some sort of transcendent moral order" and "utilitarians admitting no transcendent sanctions for conduct." He included libertarians in the latter category. Kirk, therefore, questioned the "fusionism" between libertarians and traditional conservatives that marked much of post-World War II conservatism in the United States. Kirk also argued that libertarians "bear no authority, temporal or spiritual" and do not "venerate ancient beliefs and customs, or the natural world, or [their] country, or the immortal spark in [their] fellow men."

However, Kirk's view of classical liberals is positive. He agrees with them on "ordered liberty" as they make "common cause with regular conservatives against the menace of democratic despotism and economic collectivism."

Tibor R. Machan defended libertarianism in response to Kirk's original Heritage Lecture. Machan argued that the right of individual sovereignty is perhaps most worthy of conserving from the American political heritage, and that when conservatives themselves talk about preserving some tradition, they cannot at the same time claim a disrespectful distrust of the individual human mind, of rationalism itself.

Jacob G. Hornberger of the Future of Freedom Foundation also responded to Kirk.

South Africa 
In a column in The National Review on 9 March 1965 entitled "'One Man, One Vote' in South Africa," Kirk wrote that the U.S. Supreme Court's jurisprudence on voting "will work mischief—much injuring, rather than fulfilling, the responsible democracy for which Tocqueville hoped," but in the case of South Africa "this degradation of the democratic dogma, if applied, would bring anarchy and the collapse of civilization." Kirk wrote that "the 'European' element [makes] South Africa the only 'modern' and prosperous African country." He added that "Bantu political domination [of South Africa] would be domination by witch doctors (still numerous and powerful) and reckless demagogues" and that "Bantu and Coloreds and Indians must feel that they have some political voice in the South African commonwealth."

Neoconservatism 
Late in life, Kirk grew disenchanted with American neoconservatives as well.  As Chronicles editor Scott Richert describes it:
[One line] helped define the emerging struggle between neoconservatives and paleoconservatives. "Not seldom has it seemed," Kirk declared, "as if some eminent Neoconservatives mistook Tel Aviv for the capital of the United States." A few years later, in another Heritage Foundation speech, Kirk repeated that line verbatim. In the wake of the Gulf War, which he had opposed, he clearly understood that those words carried even greater meaning.

He also commented the neoconservatives were "often clever, never wise."

Midge Decter, Jewish director of the Committee for the Free World, called Kirk's remark "a bloody outrage, a piece of anti-Semitism by Kirk that impugns the loyalty of neoconservatives." She told The New Republic, "It's this notion of a Christian civilization. You have to be part of it or you're not really fit to conserve anything. That's an old line and it's very ignorant."

Samuel T. Francis called Kirk's "Tel Aviv" remark "a wisecrack about the slavishly pro-Israel sympathies among neoconservatives." He described Decter's response as untrue, "reckless" and "vitriolic." Furthermore, he argued that such a denunciation "always plays into the hands of the left, which is then able to repeat the charges and claim conservative endorsement of them.

The Gulf War 
Toward the end of his life, Russell Kirk was highly critical of Republican militarism. President Bush, Kirk said, had embarked upon "a radical course of intervention in the region of the Persian Gulf".

Excerpts from Russell Kirk's lectures at the Heritage Foundation (1992):

Man of letters 
Kirk's other important books include Eliot and his Age: T. S. Eliot's Moral Imagination in the Twentieth Century (1972), The Roots of American Order (1974), and the autobiographical Sword of the Imagination: Memoirs of a Half Century of Literary Conflict (1995). As was the case with his hero Edmund Burke, Kirk became renowned for the prose style of his intellectual and polemical writings.

Fiction 
Beyond his scholarly achievements, Kirk was talented both as an oral storyteller and as an author of genre fiction, most notably in his telling of consummate ghost stories in the classic tradition of Sheridan Le Fanu, M. R. James, Oliver Onions, and H. Russell Wakefield. He also wrote other admired and much-anthologized works that are variously classified as horror, fantasy, science fiction, and political satire. These earned him plaudits from fellow creative writers as varied and distinguished as T. S. Eliot, Robert Aickman, Madeleine L'Engle, and Ray Bradbury.

Though modest in quantity—it encompasses three novels and 22 short stories—Kirk's body of fiction was written amid a busy career as prolific nonfiction writer, editor, and speaker. As with such other speculative fiction authors as G. K. Chesterton, C. S. Lewis, and J. R. R. Tolkien (all of whom likewise wrote only nonfiction for their "day jobs"), there are conservative undercurrents—social, cultural, religious, and political—to Kirk's fiction. Kirk stated in 1984 that the purpose of his stories as: "The political ferocity of our age is sufficiently dismaying: men of letters need not conjure up horrors worse than those suffered during the past decade by the Cambodians and Ugandans, Afghans and Ethiopians. What I have attempted, rather, are experiments in the moral imagination. Readers will encounter elements of parable and fable...some clear premise is about the character of human existence...a healthy concept of the character of evil..."

His first novel, Old House of Fear (1961, 1965), as with so many of his short stories, was written in a self-consciously Gothic vein. Here the plot is concerned with an American assigned by his employer to a bleak locale in rural Scotland—the same country where Kirk had attended graduate school. This was Kirk's most commercially successful and critically acclaimed fictional work, doing much to sustain him financially in subsequent years. Old House of Fear was inspired by the novels of John Buchan and Kirk's own Scottish heritage. The story of Old House of Fear concerns an young American, Hugh Logan, a World War II veteran who is both brave and sensitive, sent to buy Carnglass, a remote island in the Hebrides. Upon reaching the island, he discovers that the island's owner, Lady MacAskival and her beautiful adopted daughter Mary are being held hostage by foreign spies, who are presumably working for the Soviet Union, out to sabotage a nearby NATO base. The leader of the spies is Dr. Jackman, an evil genius and nihilist intent upon wrecking a world that failed to acknowledge his greatness and whom reviewers noted was a much more vividly drawn character than the hero Logan. Dr. Jackman appears to be a prototype of Kirk's best known character, Mandred Arcane, with the only difference being the former has no values while the latter does.

Later novels were A Creature of the Twilight (1966), a dark comedy satirizing postcolonial African politics; and Lord of the Hollow Dark (1979, 1989), set in Scotland, which explores the great evil inhabiting a haunted house. 
A Creature of the Twilight concerns the adventures in Africa of a reactionary, romantic mercenary Mandred Arcane, a self-proclaimed mixture of Machiavelli and Sir Lancelot, who is an anachronistic survival of the Victorian Age who does not belong in the modern world and yet defiantly still exists, making him the "creature of the twilight". Kirk has Arcane write his pseudo-memoir in a consciously Victorian style to underline that he does not belong in the 1960s. Arcane is both a dapper intellectual and a hardened man of action, an elderly man full of an unnatural vigor, who is hired by the son of the assassinated Sultan to put down a Communist rebellion in the fictional African nation of Hamnegri, which he does despite overwhelming odds. In 1967, Kirk published a short story "Belgrummo's Hell" about a clever art thief who unwisely tries to rob the estate of the ancient Scottish warlock, Lord Belgrummo, who is later revealed to be Arcane's father. In another short story published in the same collection, "The Peculiar Demesne of Archvicar Gerontion" concerned a wizard, Archvicar Gerontion, who tries to kill Arcane by casting deadly spells.

The Lord of the Hollow Dark is set at the same Belgrummo estate first encountered in "Belgrummo's Hell"  where an evil cult led by the Aleister Crowley-like character Apollinax have assembled to secure for themselves the "Timeless Moment" of eternal sexual pleasure by sacrificing two innocents, an young woman named Marina and her infant daughter in an ancient warren called the Weem under the Belgrummo Estate. Assisting Apollinax is Archvicar Gerontion, who is really Arcane in disguise. Inspired by the novels of H.P. Lovecraft, Kirk in the Lord of the Hollow Dark has Arcane survive a "horrid chthonian pilgrimage" as he faces dark supernatural forces, confront his own family's history of evil, and refuse the appeal of a "seductive, hubristic immorality". The novel concludes with Arcane's own definition of a true "Timeless Moment" which he states: "it comes from faith, from hope, from charity; from having your work in the world; from the happiness of the people you love; or simply as a gift of grace". During his lifetime, Kirk also oversaw the publication of three collections which together encompassed all his short stories. (Three more such collections have been published posthumously, but those only reprint stories found in the earlier volumes. One such posthumous collection, Ancestral Shadows: An Anthology of Ghostly Tales, was edited by his student, friend, and collaborator Vigen Guroian, and includes both an essay by Kirk on 'ghostly tales' and Guroian's own analysis of the stories as well as Kirk's motives in writing them.) Many of Kirk's short stories, especially the ghost stories, were set in either Scotland or in the rural parts of his home state of Michigan.

Among his novels and stories, certain characters tend to recur, enriching the already considerable unity and resonance of his fictional canon. Though—through their themes and prose-style—Kirk's fiction and nonfiction works are complementary, many readers of the one have not known of his work in the other.

Having begun to write fiction fairly early in his career, Kirk appears to have stopped after the early 1980s, while continuing his nonfiction writing and research through his last year of life. For a comprehensive bibliography of his fiction, see the fiction section of his bibliography.

See also 
 Russell Kirk - Wikiquote

Bibliography

References

Further reading 
 Attarian, John, 1998, "Russell Kirk's Political Economy," Modern Age 40: 87–97. .
 Birzer, Bradley J. Russell Kirk: American Conservative (University Press of Kentucky, 2015). 574 pp.
 Brown, Charles C. ed. Russell Kirk: A Bibliography (2nd ed. 2011: Wilmington, ISI Books, 2011) 220 pages; replaces Brown's 1981 bibliography
 
 East, John P., 1984, "Russell Kirk as a Political Theorist: Perceiving the Need for Order in the Soul and in Society," Modern Age 28: 33–44. .
 
 Guroian, Vigen. Ancestral Shadows: An Anthology of Ghostly Tales. Grand Rapids, MI: Wm. B. Eerdmans Publishing Company, 2004. .
 
 Filler, Louis. "'The Wizard of Mecosta': Russell Kirk of Michigan," Michigan History, Vol 63 No 5 (Sept–Oct 1979).
 Fuller, Edmund. 'A Genre for Exploring the Reality of Evil." Wall Street Journal, July 23, 1979. 
 Hennelly, Mark M. Jr., "Dark World Enough and Time," Gothic, Vol 2 No 1 (June 1980). 
 Herron, Don. "The crepuscular Romantic: An Apprfeciation of the Fiction of Russell Kirk," '''The Romantist, No 3 (1979).
 Kirk, Russell, "Introduction: The Canon of Ghostly Tales" in The Scallion Stone by Canon basil A. Smith. Chapel Hill, NC: Whispers Press, 1980.
 Herron, Don. "Russell Kirk: Ghost Master of Mecosta" in Darrell Schweitzer (ed) Discovering Modern Horror Fiction, Merce Is, WA: Starmont House, July 1985, pp. 21–47.
 Kirk, Russell, 1995. The Sword of Imagination: Memoirs of a Half-Century of Literary Conflict. Kirk's memoirs.
 McDonald, W. Wesley, 1982. The Conservative Mind of Russell Kirk: `The Permanent Things' in an Age of Ideology. Ph.D. dissertation, The Catholic University of America. Citation: DAI 1982 43(1): 255-A. DA8213740. Online at ProQuest Dissertations & Theses.
 --------, 1983, "Reason, Natural Law, and Moral Imagination in the Thought of Russell Kirk," Modern Age 27: 15–24. .
 --------, 2004. Russell Kirk and The Age of Ideology. University of Missouri Press.
 --------, 1999. "Russell Kirk and the Prospects for Conservatism," Humanitas XII: 56–76.
 --------, 2006. "Kirk, Russell (1918–94)," in American Conservatism: An Encyclopedia  ISI Books: 471–474. Biographical entry.
 McCleod, Aaron. Great Conservative Minds: A Condensation of Russell Kirk's "The Conservative Mind" (Alabama Policy Institute, 2005) 71pp; detailed page-by-page synopsis
 Nash, George H., 1998. The Conservative Intellectual Movement in America.
 Person, Jr., James E., 1999. "Russell Kirk: A Critical Biography of a Conservative Mind". Madison Books.
 Pournelle, Jerry, "Uncanny Tales of the Moral Imagination," University Bookman, Summer 1979, Vol XIX, No 4.
 Russell, Gerald J., 1996, "The Jurisprudence of Russell Kirk," Modern Age 38: 354–63. . Reviews Kirk's writings on law, 1976–93, exploring his notion of natural law, his emphasis on the importance of the English common law tradition, and his theories of change and continuity in legal history.
 --------, 2007. "The Postmodern Imagination of Russell Kirk". University of Missouri Press.
 --------, 1999, "Time and Timeless: the Historical Imagination of Russell Kirk," Modern Age 41: 209–19. .
 --------, 2004, "Russell Kirk and Territorial Democracy," Publius 34: 109–24. .
 Steiger, Brad. "A Note on Ghostly Phenomena in Russell Kirk's Old House at Mecosta, Michigan." Strange Powers of E.D.P., NY: Belmont Books, 1969.
 Sturgeon, Theodore, "A Viewpoint, a Dewpoint," National review, vol XIV No 6, Feb 12, 1963. 
 Whitney, Gleaves, 2001, "The Swords of Imagination: Russell Kirk's Battle with Modernity," Modern Age 43: 311–20. . Argues that Kirk used five "swords of imagination": historical, political, moral, poetic, and prophetic.

See also
 The Imaginative Conservative: A Resource for those wishing to learn more about Kirk and his thought

External links 

 The Russell Kirk Center for Cultural Renewal
 Works by Russell Kirk at Hathi Trust
 Russell Kirk's articles at Crisis Magazine
 From The Academy
 Traverse magazine profile of Russell Kirk by John J. Miller
 The Neoconservatives: An Endangered Species Heritage Foundation lecture 178, December 15, 1988.
 
 
 Speech by Russell Kirk on March 21, 1968 on American conservatives Audio recording from The University of Alabama's Emphasis Symposium on Contemporary Issues

1918 births
1994 deaths
20th-century American historians
20th-century American male writers
20th-century American non-fiction writers
20th-century American novelists
20th-century American philosophers
20th-century Roman Catholics
Alumni of the University of St Andrews
American anti-war activists
American fantasy writers
American horror writers
American literary critics
American male non-fiction writers
American male novelists
American military personnel of World War II
American political philosophers
American political writers
American traditionalist Catholics
Catholics from Michigan
Converts to Roman Catholicism
Critics of atheism
Critics of neoconservatism
Duke University alumni
Ghost story writers
The Heritage Foundation
Historians of the United States
Michigan State University alumni
Military personnel from Michigan
National Review people
Non-interventionism
Novelists from Michigan
Paleoconservatism
People from Plymouth, Michigan
Presidential Citizens Medal recipients
Traditionalist Catholic writers
World Fantasy Award-winning writers
Writers of Gothic fiction
Historians from Michigan
American expatriates in the United Kingdom